CJSC "Aeroflot-Cargo" was a fully owned subsidiary of Aeroflot, founded in 1995. It was the second largest cargo airline in Russia, behind Volga-Dnepr subsidiary AirBridge Cargo. In June 2009, the shareholders of Russia's flagship air carrier, Aeroflot, decided to declare the company's cargo subsidiary, Aeroflot Cargo, bankrupt.

The cargo division of Aeroflot now operates as part of the airline's regular fleet instead of a subsidiary. On 11 May 2011, Aeroflot Russian Airlines completed preparations for joining the global airline alliance SkyTeam Cargo. They will be the 9th member of the alliance.

Operations
Until December 2009, Aeroflot-Cargo operated regular cargo-carrying flights from Europe to Asia and back via Russia. 

On 5 April 2010, the company was declared bankrupt and bankruptcy proceedings were introduced, aircraft returning to lessors and a general wind-down of operations.

Destinations

Aeroflot-Cargo served the following destinations (at June 2009):

Asia
 
 Beijing - Beijing Capital International Airport
 Shanghai - Shanghai Pudong International Airport
 
 Hong Kong - Hong Kong International Airport
 
 Tokyo - Narita International Airport
 
 Seoul - Incheon International Airport

Europe
 
 Helsinki - Helsinki Airport
 
 Hahn - Frankfurt–Hahn Airport
 
 Moscow - Sheremetyevo International Airport Hub
 Novosibirsk - Tolmachevo Airport
 Saint Petersburg - Pulkovo Airport

Fleet

The Aeroflot-Cargo Division fleet consists of the following (at 24 May 2011):

References

External links

Official website 
Aeroflot-Cargo Fleet

Former Aeroflot divisions
Airlines established in 2005
Airlines disestablished in 2009
Cargo airlines of Russia
Companies based in Moscow
Government-owned airlines
Defunct airlines of Russia
Government-owned companies of Russia
2009 disestablishments in Russia
Russian companies established in 2005